Persian Room may refer to: 

 A section of the Gayer-Anderson Museum 
 A former music venue at the Plaza Hotel